The Hyosung GD250N (Naza N5 in Malaysia) is a   naked sportbike made by KR Motors of South Korea and Naza of Malaysia. The GD250R is a variant of the GD250N that contains the same chassis and engine within a trellis frame, which increases the bike's overall weight by 50 pounds.

The riding position of the GD250N lies between that of a standard bike and a sport bike.

References 

Hyosung
Sport bikes
Standard motorcycles